Sysco Corporation (short for Systems and Services Company) is an American multinational corporation involved in marketing and distributing food products, smallwares, kitchen equipment and tabletop items to restaurants, healthcare and educational facilities, hospitality businesses like hotels and inns, and wholesale to other  companies that provide foodservice (like Aramark and Sodexo). The company is headquartered in the Energy Corridor district of Houston, Texas. Sysco is the world's largest broadline food distributor; it has more than 600,000 clients in a wide array of fields. Management consulting is also an integral part of their services. The company operates approximately 330 distribution facilities worldwide; providing service to over 90 countries.

The company was founded by Herbert Irving, John F. Baugh and Harry Rosenthal in 1969. The company became public on March 3, 1970. On July 20, 2009, Fortune magazine ranked Sysco No. 204 in the annual Fortune 500 companies in world based on sales volume. On May 3, 2010, Fortune ranked Sysco as the seventh largest Fortune 500 Company in Texas and 55th largest in the U.S. by total revenue. Sysco is also the largest non-oil related company in Houston and the third largest non-oil related company in Texas (behind AT&T and  Dell). The company ranked No. 54 in the 2018 Fortune 500 list of the largest US corporations by total revenue.

In December 2013, Sysco announced an $8.2 billion planned acquisition of its next-largest food distribution rival, US Foods. The Federal Trade Commission challenged the acquisition as a violation of the Clayton Antitrust Act that would substantially lessen competition. After the court ruled that the combined company would likely reduce competition because it would control 75% of the U.S. food service industry, Sysco terminated its merger with US Foods.

History
In 1981, SYSCO Food Services bought out the assets of Lankford Produce, based in West Pocomoke, Maryland and founded in 1964, by Stanley E. Lankford Jr., forming the Lankford-SYSCO division in the Delmarva Peninsula, renamed Sysco Eastern Maryland in 2008.

In 1988, Sysco acquired CFS Continental which had recently been acquired from Tate & Lyle through their purchase of A. E. Staley in Illinois.

In 1996, Sysco was the third largest company in Houston. It had over 30,000 employees.

In 1999 Sysco acquired Newport Meat Company, which generated a yearly revenue of $100 million supplying meat to over 1,000 restaurants.

In 2002, Sysco purchased SERCA Foodservices and renamed it Sysco Canada. SERCA had been owned by the supermarket giant Oshawa Group, which was acquired by Sobeys in 1998.

In 2003, Sysco purchased Asian Foods, the largest Asian foods distribution in North America. The first group of Asian Foods joined Sysco Kansas City in 2006, followed by Asian Foods Chicago joining Sysco Chicago in Sep, 2009.

In 2009, Sysco acquired Pallas Foods, the largest food distributor in Ireland. Continuing the expansion of their Irish offerings, in 2012, Sysco purchased Crossgar Foodservice for an undisclosed amount.

On December 9, 2013, Sysco announced they would acquire US Foods for a total of $3.5 billion. But on June 24, 2015, US Federal Judge Amit Mehta ruled that the combined Sysco-US Foods would control 75% of the U.S. food service industry and would stifle competition. On June 29, 2015, Sysco terminated its merger with US Foods.

In May 2022, after a year of testing, Sysco committed to the purchase of Freightliner eCascadia electric trucks, with the goal of electrifying 35% of its fleet by 2026.

Subsidiaries
The SYGMA Network, Inc. is a wholly owned subsidiary of Sysco that provides food and non-food products to chain restaurants throughout the United States.

SYGMA was founded in January 1984, when senior officers of Sysco Corporation started discussions for forming a new distribution company. The first products were shipped in May 1985, from SYGMA's first distribution center in Oklahoma. In 1988, Sysco acquired CFS, increasing head count at the organization.

SYGMA's customers include approximately 14,000 restaurants representing 26 concepts. Operating from 14 distribution centers, SYGMA is one of the largest chain distributors in the United States with sales over $6.7 billion. 186 million cases of product are delivered each year. SYGMA currently employs over 4,000 employees.

Controversies
Beginning in the summer of 2013, the California Department of Public Health was investigating the storage of food in a total of 21 sheds which were never regulated and never inspected. The food included overnight drop-offs of chicken, pork, beef, bacon, and milk. An employee speaking anonymously stated that sheds in Spokane, Washington, had refrigerators which were not large enough, and that most of the time there were cases of frozen food sitting on the floor outside the refrigerators.

On July 16, 2014, Sysco agreed to pay fines totaling $19.4 million in California and admitted to the allegations made by KNTV's news team and investigated by the California Department of Public Health.

References

External links

Sysco Corporation website

Asian Foods Inc.
BusinessWeek 50 ranking and analysis of Sysco
The SYGMA Network, Inc.

Catering and food service companies of the United States
Multinational companies headquartered in the United States
Companies based in Houston
Food and drink companies established in 1969
1969 establishments in Texas
Companies listed on the New York Stock Exchange
1970s initial public offerings